Zolota Balka is a village in Beryslav Raion (district) in Kherson Oblast of southern Ukraine, at about  northeast by east from the centre of Kherson city, on the right bank of the Dnipro river, on the western bank of the Kakhovka Reservoir. It belongs to the Novooleksandrivka rural hromada, one of the hromadas of Ukraine.

Until 18 July 2020, Zolota Balka belonged to Novovorontsovka Raion. The raion was abolished in July 2020 as part of the administrative reform of Ukraine, which reduced the number of raions of Kherson Oblast to five. The area of Novovorontsovka Raion was merged into Beryslav Raion.

The settlement came under attack by Russian forces during the Russian invasion of Ukraine in 2022 and was regained by Ukrainian forces in the beginning of October the same year.

Demographics
The settlement had 1681 inhabitants in 2001, native language distribution as of the Ukrainian Census of the same year:
Ukrainian: 96.19%
Russian: 3.45%
Belarusian: 0.30%

References

Villages in Beryslav Raion
Populated places on the Dnieper in Ukraine